The Peoria and Eastern Railway was incorporated on February 21, 1890, for the purpose of constructing or acquiring a railway between Pekin, Illinois, and Indianapolis, Indiana.  The following day, the company acquired such a railroad from Charles H. Coster and Samuel Spencer, who had purchased the railroad in a foreclosure sale of the Ohio, Indiana and Western Railway, which had become insolvent the previous year.  On the same day, the company entered into an agreement with the Cleveland, Cincinnati, Chicago and St. Louis Railway, surrendering operation and control of the railroad to that company, also known as the "Big Four".

Defunct Illinois railroads
Defunct Indiana railroads
Railroads transferred to Conrail
Former Class I railroads in the United States
Predecessors of the New York Central Railroad
Railway companies established in 1890
Railway companies disestablished in 1976
Defunct Ohio railroads